The Million Dollar Band (sometimes shortened to MDB) is the official marching band of the University of Alabama. Founded in 1912, the Million Dollar Band is the largest student organization at the University of Alabama. The band performs during pregame and halftime of every home and neutral-site Alabama football game; it also supplies at least a pep band to every away football game, as well as home men's basketball, women's basketball, women's gymnastics, and volleyball games. In 2003, the band was awarded the Sudler Trophy, recognizing it as one of the top college bands in the United States.

History 

The Million Dollar Band, which was first known simply as the "Alabama Band", was formed as a military band in 1912. In its first year, the band consisted of just 14 members under director Dr. Gustav Wittig, who was also an engineering and physics professor at the university. He served as director for five years before stepping down; the band was then student-led until 1927, when Captain H. H. Turner took over as director. The story of how the band earned its name is contested, but the account recognized by the university (released in the 1948 football media guide) is as follows: during the 1922 football season, Alabama visited Georgia Tech and got blown out, 33–7. Champ Pickens, a notable Alabama alumnus who was present at the game, was asked by a local sportswriter, "You don't have much of a team, what do you have at Alabama?". In response, Pickens quipped, "A million dollar band." His inspiration for the term came from his observation of the impressive effort the small band had put into soliciting funds from local merchants in order to accompany the football team to off-campus games.

In 1936, Colonel Carleton K. Butler (for whom the band’s practice field is named) took over the band and led it to national prominence among collegiate marching bands. Colonel Butler was known as the "Father of the Million Dollar Band." The 1935 season was one of rebuilding for the Crimson Tide. The previous season had produced a national title but gone were All-Americans Bill Lee, Dixie Howell, and Don Hudson. There were, however, two men that would become significant forces in the Alabama tradition on campus that year. Paul W. Bryant was entering his senior season as an Alabama player while Carleton K. Butler was beginning his first season as director of the "Million Dollar Band." Butler came to the university in 1935 and stayed until his retirement in 1969. Although the band was already an integral part of the Bama tradition, Butler would lead them to a higher level of prominence. Like Bryant, Colonel Butler's trademarks were discipline and sacrifice. The title of Colonel was an honorary distinction awarded by the ROTC in 1938. During Colonel Butler's tenure, the "Million Dollar Band" performed at 14 bowl games, appeared on numerous television broadcasts, represented the University at three governor's inaugurations and performed at the 1949 inauguration of President Harry S. Truman. His bands became famous for their precise marching formations, including the correct time, temperature, and even the score of the game. Majorettes were not allowed in his bands, but a coed sponsor led each march carrying a bouquet of roses. The Colonel also served as an instructor in the Music Department and helped train many music students that would hold positions as high school and college band leaders throughout the nation. During World War II he directed many area high school and military bands in addition to his duties with the University of Alabama's marching band. He also played the oboe in the Birmingham Civic Symphony and authored numerous books and professional articles on music. After Colonel Butler's retirement in 1969, he and his wife moved to Asheville, North Carolina, where he lived until his death in 1993. Under Colonel Carleton Butler's guidance, the "Million Dollar Band" attained national acclaim and many honors, prompting former President Roger Sayers to say in an article for the Crimson White,"What Paul W. Bryant was to Alabama football, Colonel Carleton K. Butler was to Alabama's music program and bands." 

Butler remained director for 33 years. Earl Dunn took charge in 1969. After Dunn’s two-year stint at the Capstone, Dr. James Ferguson was named director, where he remained until 1983. Alabama coach Paul "Bear" Bryant often voiced his support for the band during his tenure, sometimes partially crediting it after victories. After the tenure of Dr. Ferguson, Kahthyrn Scott took over as director. Kathryn Scott is the first woman to be marching band director at a Division I school. Scott changed the band's marching style to corps style, as opposed to traditional marching. Scott often included pyrotechnics in halftime performances. The United States Army Herald Trumpets were included in her final halftime show, called "Halftime of a Lifetime". Dr. Kenneth Ozzello has been in charge of the band since 2002. One year after he was named director, the band won the Sudler Trophy, awarded by the John Philip Sousa Foundation. Ozzello continues the corps style and helped cement the pregame show as one of the most iconic in the country. A staple of pregame is "The Big Bama Spell Out" as well as "Tusk" when the band forms an elephant and marches down the field.

Directors

Traditions 

Alma Mater - Dr. Ozzello became director in 2003 and started this MDB tradition of singing the Alma Mater after every Friday/gameday rehearsal, as well as after every game, win or lose.
Band Dismissal - At the end of every single rehearsal, game, etc. someone shouts "What do we say at Alabama?". The Leadership team responds with "Go Bama!" and then all members shout "Roll Tide!" This is similar to a scene from the 1995 movie Crimson Tide.
Elephant Stomp - Prior to every home game the MDB performs the elephant stomp. Each section warms up then meets on the steps of the Gorgas library. The MDB and cheerleaders lead the crowd in several cheers in a short pep rally, usually lasting less than 10 minutes. The MDB then lines up on Colonial Drive and marches to Bryant–Denny Stadium.
Big B-A-M-A Spellout - During the Pregame show, the PA announcer directs the crowd to shoutout 'B', 'A', 'M', 'A' while the band forms the block letters on the field.

Songs and Cheers 

Yea Alabama - The University of Alabama's official fight song.
Tusk - This song was recorded by Fleetwood Mac in collaboration with the University of Southern California Trojan Marching Band at Dodger Stadium. From the Fleetwood Mac version, "Tusk" being shorthand for the university's home city of Tuscaloosa, accompanied by the school's dancing elephant mascot, Big Al. The band forms a large elephant on the field, with Big AL being introduced to the crowd of 100,000+ fans.
Rammer Jammer Cheer - (informally known as the "Ole Miss Cheer" or “O cheer”) is played at the end-of-the game, after the team has won the game. Dr. Ferguson introduced the cheer to the band during the early 1980s. The lyrics to the cheer were based upon the Ole Miss' Hotty Toddy cheer, the school which Dr. Ferguson was teaching at prior to coming to Bama.
Basket Case - Beginning in mid-1996, the Million Dollar Band began playing a Fred Chang arrangement of the Green Day song "Basket Case" in the break between the 3rd and 4th quarters. This continued until midway through the 2006 season, when the Marketing Department decided to play "Sweet Home Alabama" over the PA system instead. The MDB continued to play the song, just at different points of the game. "Sweet Home Alabama" was still played during 2007 up to the Houston game. Since that game the MDB has played "Basketcase" during the 4th quarter break once again. 
Low Rider - Song played by the Trombone section in the fourth quarter of the football game. It has been in existence since at least 1986, when it was recorded on an LP. Mark Foster wrote the arrangement from a similar version that was played at his high school. 
Defense Cheer # 1 - Since 2002, the band has used the song "Look Down" from the musical Les Misérables as the main defense cheer. This arrangement was taken from the 1996 "Les Miserables" Halftime Show. The band currently has six defense cheers.
The band also plays upon occasion You Can Call Me Al, the theme from the TV show The A-Team and My Home's in Alabama from the country group, Alabama.

Band Recordings 
Million Dollar Band LP - [1976] Under the direction of Dr. James S. Ferguson.
Million Dollar Band LP - [1986]
Million Dollar Band CD - [1993] The band's first professional produced CD.
Million Dollar Band CD - [1998]
Million Dollar Band CD - [2002] Tribute CD to Kathryn Scott's career as director of the MDB.
Million Dollar Band CD - [2003-present]  Under the direction of Dr. Ken Ozello, the band produces a CD every year which includes the three halftime performances of that year, pregame music, stand tunes, and other school songs.

Appearances 

Paul Bryant Years (1958-1982)
1966 Orange Bowl - Miami, FL - January 1966
1967 Sugar Bowl - New Orleans, LA - January 1967 - MDB accompanied trumpeter Al Hirt at halftime at Tulane Stadium
1968 Cotton Bowl - Dallas, TX - January 1968
1968 Gator Bowl - Jacksonville, FL - December 1968
1969 Liberty Bowl - Memphis, TN - December 1969
1972 Orange Bowl - Miami, FL - January 1972
1973 Sugar Bowl - New Orleans, LA - December 1973
1975 Orange Bowl - Miami, FL - January 1975
1975 Sugar Bowl - New Orleans, LA - December 1975 - First Sugar Bowl in the Louisiana Superdome
1976 Liberty Bowl - Memphis, TN - December 1976 - Wind chill: 11 degrees F (NY Times)
1978 Sugar Bowl - New Orleans, LA - January 1978
1979 Sugar Bowl - New Orleans, LA - January 1979
1980 Sugar Bowl - New Orleans, LA - January 1980
1981 Cotton Bowl - Dallas, TX - January 1981
1982 Cotton Bowl - Dallas, TX - January 1982
1982 Liberty Bowl - Memphis, TN - December 1982

Gene Stalling Years 1990-1996
1994 SEC Championship Game - Atlanta, GA - December 1994 - First time the band performed in the Georgia Dome
1995 Florida Citrus Bowl & Parade - Orlando, FL - Dec/Jan 1995
1995 Fob James Governor Inaugural Parade - Montgomery, AL - January 1995
1996 SEC Championship Game - Atlanta, GA - December 1996
1997 Outback Bowl - Tampa, FL - January 1997

Mike Dubose Years (1997-2000)
1998 Music City Bowl - Nashville, TN - December 1997 - Inaugural Music City Bowl
1999 SEC Championship Game - Atlanta, GA - December 1999
2000 Orange Bowl & Parade - Miami, FL - Dec '99/Jan 2000
2000 Senior Bowl - Ladd–Peebles Stadium; Mobile, AL - January 2000 - First Senior Bowl performance by the band
2000 Knights of Revelry (KOR) Mardi Gras Parade - Mobile, AL - February 2000
2000 Alabama vs. UCLA football game - Pasadena, CA - Pep Band of the "Million Dollar Band" first ever performance at the famed Rose Bowl Stadium

Dennis Franchione Years 2001-02
2001 Independence Bowl - Shreveport, LA - December 2001
2001 Knights of Revelry (KOR) Mardi Gras Parade - Mobile, AL - February 2001

Mike Shula Years 2003-06
2003 Bob Riley Governor Inaugural Parade - Montgomery, AL - January 2003
2004 Music City Bowl - Nashville, TN - December 2004
2005 ESPN "Cold Pizza" on the UA Quad - Tuscaloosa, AL - November 2005

Saban years (2007–Present)
2006 Senior Bowl - Ladd–Peebles Stadium; Mobile, AL - January 2006
2007 Bob Riley Inaugural Parade - Montgomery, AL - January 2007
2007 ESPN "Gameday" on the UA Quad - Tuscaloosa, AL - September 2007
2007 Bands of America Super Regional - Georgia Dome; Atlanta, GA - October 2007
2008 Senior Bowl - Ladd-Peebles Stadium; Mobile, AL - January 2008
2008 SEC Championship Game - Atlanta, GA - December 2008
2009 Senior Bowl - Ladd–Peebles Stadium; Mobile, AL - January 2009
2009 SEC Championship Game - Atlanta, GA - December 2009
2010 BCS National Championship Game - Pasadena, CA - January 2010 - First Full Band performance at the Rose Bowl Stadium
2012 SEC Championship Game - Atlanta, GA - December 2012
2012 BCS National Championship Game - New Orleans, LA
2013 BCS National Championship Game - Miami Gardens, FL - January 2013
2014 Sugar Bowl - New Orleans, LA - January 2014
2014 SEC Championship Game - Atlanta, GA - December 2014
2015 Sugar Bowl - New Orleans, LA - January 2015
2015 SEC Championship Game - Atlanta, GA - December 2015
2015 Cotton Bowl Classic (December) - Arlington, TX - December 2015
2016 College Football Playoff National Championship - Phoenix, AZ - January 2016
2016 SEC Championship Game - Atlanta, GA - December 2016
2016 Peach Bowl - Atlanta, GA - December 2016
2017 College Football Playoff National Championship - Tampa, FL - January 2017
2017 Bands of America Grand National Championship - Lucas Oil Stadium - Indianapolis, Indiana in November 2017
2018 Sugar Bowl -  New Orleans, LA - January 2018
2018 College Football Playoff National Championship - Atlanta, GA - January 2018
2018 Orange Bowl -  Miami Gardens, FL - December 27, 2018
2019 College Football Playoff National Championship - Santa Clara, CA - January 7, 2019
2019 Senior Bowl - Ladd-Peebles Stadium; Mobile, AL - January 2019
2021 Macy's Thanksgiving Day Parade - New York, NY - November 25, 2021
2021 SEC Championship Game - Atlanta, GA - December 4, 2021
2021 Cotton Bowl Classic - Arlington, TX - December 31, 2021
2022 College Football Playoff National Championship - Indianapolis, IN - January 10, 2022

References

External links 
 

University of Alabama
Southeastern Conference marching bands
Musical groups from Alabama
Musical groups established in 1912
1912 establishments in Alabama
College marching bands in the United States